The Rel homology domain (RHD) is a protein domain found in a family of eukaryotic transcription factors, including both NF-κB and NFAT, among others. Some of these transcription factors appear to form multi-protein DNA-bound complexes. Phosphorylation of the RHD appears to play a role in the regulation of some of these transcription factors, acting to modulate the expression of their target genes.

The RHD is composed of two immunoglobulin-like beta barrel subdomains that grip the DNA in the major groove. The N-terminal specificity domain resembles the core domain of the p53 transcription factor, and contains a recognition loop that interacts with DNA bases. In the case of NF-κB, the C-terminal dimerization subdomain determines dimerization propensity with other proteins in the NF-κB/Rel protein family.  The dimerization subdomain is immediately followed by a nuclear localization sequence that also comprises the site for inhibitory interactions with IκB.

References 

Protein domains